Kjastas Poudžuks (born 23 August 1986) is a motorcycle speedway rider from Latvia and the former Latvian champion.

Speedway career
He rode in the top tier of British Speedway riding for the Oxford Cheetahs during the 2005 Elite League speedway season.

Speedway Grand Prix results

Honours

Individual World Championship (Speedway Grand Prix):
2006 - 21 place (4 points)
2007 - (1 points)
Individual U-21 World Championship:
2007 - 13 place (3 point)
Team World Championship (Speedway World Cup):
2006 - 4 place in Qualifying round 1 (11 points)
 2009 - 2nd place in Qualifying round 2 (15 points)
Individual U-19 European Championship:
2002 - track reserve (2 points)
2004 - 5 place (10 points)
2005 - Silver medal (11 points)
 European Club Champions' Cup:
 2008 -  Slaný - 4th place (2 points)
Individual Latvian Championship:
2004 - Latvian Champion
2006 - Silver medal
2007 - Latvian Champion
2015 - Latvian Champion
Individual Junior Latvian Championship:
2003 - Latvian Champion
2004 - Latvian Champion
2005 - Latvian Champion
2006 - Latvian Champion

See also 
 Latvia national speedway team
 List of Speedway Grand Prix riders

References 

1986 births
Living people
Latvian speedway riders
Oxford Cheetahs riders
Sportspeople from Daugavpils